The Thrillseeker was a steel roller coaster located at Sea World on the Gold Coast, Queensland, Australia. Designed by S.D.C., the Galaxi model opened to the public in 1982. The ride is now a traveling roller coaster owned by Shorts Amusements of Victoria known as Taipan.

History
In 1982, Sea World opened the park's first roller coaster, the Wild Wave Rollercoaster, along with the Pirate Ship and Carousel. The Wild Wave Rollercoaster was later renamed to the Thrillseeker. In May 2002, the Thrillseeker was closed and removed from Sea World. It now operates as a traveling roller coaster owned by Shorts Amusements of Victoria, known as Taipan.

Following the ride's removal, proposals were made for the area it once occupied. These included a seal exhibit named Seal Rocks and a hippopotamus attraction was proposed for the site. From 2006 to 2008 the site was home to the temporary Sea World Eye. In September 2008, work began on the site for a yet-to-be-named ray exhibit. By October, the name of the exhibit was announced to be Ray Reef. It was originally scheduled that the exhibit would open on Boxing Day 2008 (26 December 2008), however, a number of delays forced it to open on 14 January 2009.

Ride
The track is steel, and the trains consist of two four-seat cars per train, for a train capacity of 8 passengers.

The ride began with the right turn out of the station. After ascending the  chain lift hill riders were sent in a course of quick dips and spiralling helixes.

References

External links
 

Roller coasters in Australia
Roller coasters operated by Village Roadshow Theme Parks
1982 establishments in Australia
2002 disestablishments in Australia